Asselstine is a surname. Notable people with the surname include:

Brian Asselstine (born in 1953), American baseball player
Jack Asselstine (1895-1966), Canadian ice hockey player
Ron Asselstine (born 1946), Canadian ice hockey player
William James Asselstine (1891-1973), Canadian politician

See Also
Asselstine, Ontario, communities of Loyalist, Ontario